AO, aO, Ao, or ao may refer to:

Arts and entertainment 
 Adults Only, an entertainment rating
 AO Music (AOmusic), a world-music fusion group consisting of Jay Oliver, Miriam Stockley and others
 Ao: The Last Hunter, a 2010 prehistoric drama movie
 Eureka Seven: AO, Japanese mecha anime television series
 Lord Ao, a fictional deity in the Dungeons & Dragons universe
 Annoying Orange, an American comedy web series

Businesses and organizations 
 AO (originally American Optical Company) eyeglass lenses, a brand now merged with Carl Zeiss Vision
 AO Foundation (originally ), a non-profit organisation dedicated to the treatment of trauma and disorders of the musculoskeletal system
 AO World, a UK retailer of household appliances trading under the brand name ao.com
 Athletics Ontario, formally Ontario Track and Field Association (OTAF)
 Australian Airlines (IATA code AO)

Government and politics 
 Administrative Office of the United States Courts
 Administrative Officer, a grade within the United Kingdom's Civil Service
 Angola (ISO code and NATO country code AO)
 Autonomous oblast, type of Russian administrative division
 Autonomous okrug, type of Russian administrative division
 NSDAP/AO, Foreign Organization branch of the Nazi Party
 Officer of the Order of Australia, postnominal AO

Military 
 Area of operations, a U.S. military term
 AO, a U.S. Navy hull classification symbol for an oiler
 AO-, the prefix for several firearms
 Aviation Ordnanceman, a United States Navy occupational rating

Philosophy and religion 
 Alpha and Omega (abbreviation)
 Ao (mythology), a deity in Māori mythology
 Ao (turtle), a creature in Chinese mythology
 Ao, a type of Easter Island wood carving

Science and technology 
 .ao, top-level Internet domain code for Angola
 Adaptive optics, an astronomical imaging technology
 Ambient occlusion, a shading method in computer graphics
 AMSAT-OSCAR, a satellite naming convention
 Applied Optics, scientific journal published by the Optical Society of America (OSA)
 Arctic oscillation, a climate pattern
 Atomic orbital, in physics and chemistry
 Ao, the atomic symbol for the misidentified chemical element Ausenium.
 Authorship obfuscation, a privacy technique

Surnames and initials 
 Ao (surname), a Chinese surname
 Ou (surname) (/ and /), romanized as Ao in Cantonese
 Aaron Owens (born 1976), American streetball player

Other uses
 Alphabetically ordered
 Ao (color)
 Ao languages
 Ao Naga, an Indian ethnic group
 Australian Open, an annual tennis tournament in Melbourne, Australia
 A, an abbreviation of "Anno", meaning "In the year" (as in Anno Domini)

See also 
 Alpha and Omega (disambiguation)
 
 
 A0 (disambiguation)